Vazhikadavu Weir (Malayalam:വഴിക്കടവ് തടയണ) is a diversion dam of concrete gravity type constructed across Meenachil River at Teekoy Village in Kottayam District in Kerala,  India. The Vazhikkadavu weir is constructed as an augmentation scheme to Idukki HEP.

Narakakkanam, Azhutha, Vazhikkadavu, Vadakkepuzha and Kuttiar diversion schemes were later added to augment the Idukki reservoir. The weir site and tunnel inlet are located in Meenachil taluk of Kottayam District and tunnel exit site is located in Peermade taluk of Idukki district. The diversion weir site is near Vagamon – 2 km from Vagamon town on Vagomon Erattupetta road. The construction started in 1989 but was completed in 2002.

Specifications 

 Latitude : 9⁰ 41′ N
 Longitude: 76⁰ 54′ E
 Panchayath : Teekoy
 Village : Teekoy
 District : Kottayam
 River Basin : Periyar
 River : Meenachil river
 Release from Dam to river : Meenachil river
 Taluk through which release flows : Meenachil
 Year of completion : 2002
 Name of Project:Idukki HEP
 Type of Project : Hydro Power
 Type of Dam : Concrete- Gravity
 Classification : Weir
 Maximum Water Level (MWL) : EL 939.00
 Full Reservoir Level ( FRL) : EL 936.70 m
 Storage at FRL : 0.18 Mm3
 Height from deepest foundation : 10.20 m
 Length : 58.00 m
 Spillway : Ungated – Overflow section
 Crest Level : EL 936.70 m
 River Outlet : 1 No. Circular type, 0.75 m dia

References 

Dams in Kerala
Dams completed in 2002